Peter Johannesson (born 12 May 1992) is a Swedish handball player for Bergischer HC and the Swedish national team.

Playing for IK Sävehof, he won the EHF European Cup with this club in the 2013–14 season

He represented Sweden at the 2021 World Men's Handball Championship.

References

External links

1992 births
Living people
Swedish male handball players
Sportspeople from Västra Götaland County
Expatriate handball players
Swedish expatriate sportspeople in Germany
Handball-Bundesliga players
IK Sävehof players
Bergischer HC players
21st-century Swedish people